Engelbert Fuchs was an Austrian luger who competed in the 1970s. A natural track luger, he won two medals at the FIL European Luge Natural Track Championships with a silver in 1975 (Doubles) and a bronze in 1973 (Singles).

References
Natural track European Championships results 1970-2006.

Year of birth missing
Possibly living people
Austrian male lugers